Anna Reshma Rajan is an Indian actress who appears in Malayalam films. She made her debut in 2017 with the film Angamaly Diaries. She worked as a nurse in a private hospital in Kochi before making her first foray into films.

Personal life  
Anna was born in Aluva a suburb of the city of Kochi in Kerala to Sheeba and KC Rajan. She has an elder brother named Shaun. Anna's father died of a heart-attack when she was in college, the sudden demise of her father put a lot of financial pressure on her family, so she had to take up jobs while in college to support the family financially.

Most of Anna's education took place in Aluva, she did her schooling from Nirmala Higher Secondary School, after which she completed her eleventh and twelfth grade from St Frances College in Aluva. She studied nursing from Government Medical College, Ernakulam. Anna, liked to play sports and has competed at various sporting district level activities representing her school and college.

Career 
Anna Rajan hails from Aluva in Kerala. She worked as a nurse in Rajagiri Hospital in Aluva before foraying into films. She was identified by producer Vijay Babu and director Lijo Jose Pellissery after seeing her face in a hoarding in Kerala. They made her audition for the role of Lichy in Angamaly Diaries. Including her, the film introduced 86 debutant actors. In the film she is credited as Reshma Rajan. After that, she preferred to be credited as Anna Rajan. Her second film was the Lal Jose directorial Velipadinte Pusthakam (2017), in which she starred opposite Mohanlal.

Filmography

Short films,Web series and Documentary

References

External links 
 

Year of birth missing (living people)
Living people
Indian film actresses
Actresses in Malayalam cinema
Actresses from Kochi
21st-century Indian actresses
People from Aluva